Nematocentropus omeiensis is a species of moth belonging to the family Neopseustidae. It was described by Hwang in 1965. It is known from Mount Omei in the Sichuan Province of China.

References

Neopseustidae